Marija Težak (born 1 June 1957) is a former Slovenian-Yugoslavian gymnast. She competed at the 1972 Summer Olympics.

References

External links
 

1957 births
Living people
Slovenian female artistic gymnasts
Olympic gymnasts of Yugoslavia
Gymnasts at the 1972 Summer Olympics
Sportspeople from Ljubljana